Taichleach Ua Dubhda (died 1192) was King of Uí Fiachrach Muaidhe.

Annalistic references

 1182. Murrough, the son of Taichleach O'Dowda, was killed by Melaghlin O'Mulrony.
 1192. Taichleach O'Dowda, Lord of Hy-Awley and Hy-Fiachrach of the Moy, was slain by his own two grandsons.

External links
 http://www.ucc.ie/celt/published/T100005C/index.html

Monarchs from County Mayo
People from County Sligo
12th-century Irish monarchs
1192 deaths
Year of birth unknown